For Whom the Bell Tolls is a British television series first aired by BBC  in 1965, based on the 1940 novel by Ernest Hemingway. It stars John Ronane, Ann Bell, Julian Curry, Glynn Edwards and Joan Miller.  The film was adapted for television by Giles Cooper and was directed by Rex Tucker.  It consisted of four 45-minute episodes, the first of which aired on 2 October 1965. According to the BBC archives none of the episodes of the film still exist.

External links

BBC television dramas
Lost television shows
1960s British drama television series
1965 British television series debuts
1965 British television series endings
Films based on works by Ernest Hemingway